

With Wainwright's Gentlemen
Rare Mod – Vol. 3 (2010, compilation, "Ain't That Just Like Me")

With Episode Six
Put Yourself in My Place (1987)
The Complete Episode Six (1991)
BBC Radio 1 Live 1968/1969 (1997)
Cornflakes and Crazyfoam (2002)
Love, Hate, Revenge (2005)
 Compilation albums of songs recorded between 1965 and 1969

With Deep Purple (1969-1973, 1984-1988),(1993-)

Numerical values indicate highest position achieved in the United Kingdom album charts.

Studio albums
 Deep Purple in Rock  (1970, No. 4 UK)
 Fireball (1971, No. 1 UK)
 Machine Head (1972, No. 1 UK)
 Who Do We Think We Are (1973, No. 4 UK)
 Perfect Strangers (1984, No. 5 UK)
 The House of Blue Light (1987, No. 10 UK)
 The Battle Rages On (1993, No. 21 UK)
 Purpendicular (1996, No. 58 UK)
 Abandon (1998, No. 76 UK)
 Bananas (2003, No. 85 UK)
 Rapture of the Deep (2005, No. 81 UK)
 Now What?! (2013, No. 19 UK)
 Infinite (2017, No. 6 UK)
 Whoosh! (2020, No. 4 UK)
 Turning to Crime (2021, No. 28 UK)

Live albums
 Concerto for Group and Orchestra (1969)
 Made in Japan (1972)
 Deep Purple in Concert (1980) (Live 1970 & 1972)
 Scandinavian Nights (1988) (Live 1970)
 Nobody's Perfect (1988)
 In the Absence of Pink (1991) (Live 1985)
 Gemini Suite Live (1993) (Live 1970)
 Live in Japan (1993) (Live 1972)
 Come Hell or High Water (1994)
 Live at the Olympia '96 (1997)
 Total Abandon: Live in Australia (1999)
 The Soundboard Series (2001)
 In Concert with The London Symphony Orchestra (2000)
 Live at the Rotterdam Ahoy (2001)
 Live in Europe 1993 (2006)
 Live at Montreux 1996 (2006) (Live 1996 & 2000)
 They All Came Down To Montreux (2007)
 Live at Montreux 2011 (2011)
 The Now What?! Live Tapes (2013)
 Live in Verona (2014)
 From The Setting Sun... (In Wacken) (2015)
 ...To The Rising Sun (In Tokyo) (2015)
 The Infinite Live Recordings, Vol 1 (2017)

With Ian Gillan Band

With Gillan

With Black Sabbath

Solo

Studio albums

Live albums
 Chris Tetley Presents: Garth Rockett & The Moonshiners (1989) [mini-album] 
 Live at the Ritz '89 (2000, as Ian Gillan & The Moonshiners)
 Live in Anaheim (2008)
 Contractual Obligation #2: Live In Warsaw (2019, with The Don Airey Band and Orchestra)
 Contractual Obligation #3: Live In St. Petersburg (2019, with The Don Airey Band and Orchestra)

Compilations
 What I Did on My Vacation (1986)
 Trouble – The Best of Ian Gillan (1991)
 The Japanese Album (1993) (including different versions of 3 songs)
 The Best of Ian Gillan (1992)
 Rock Profile (1995)
 Mercury High - The Story Of Ian Gillan (2004)

Video
 Garth Rockett & The Moonshiners Live at the Ritz (1990)
 Ian Gillan Live (1990)
 Highway Star - A Journey in Rock (2007) 
 Live in Anaheim (2008)

Singles
 South Africa (1988) [special single]

With The Javelins
 Sole Agency and Representation (1994) (rereleased as Raving with Ian Gillan & The Javelins in 2000)
 Ian Gillan and The Javelins (2018)

With WhoCares
(also known as Ian Gillan, Tony Iommi & Friends)

Albums

Singles

Other projects

Performances
 Jesus Christ Superstar (1970)
 Rock Aid Armenia (1990)
 Pretty Maids – In Santa's Claws [EP] (1990)
 The Bolland Project – Darwin (The Evolution) (1991)
 Michalis Rakintzis – Get Away (1993)
 Ray Slijngaard & Ian Gillan – Smoke on the Water Rock 'N' Rap Extravaganza (1997)
 Jill Towers – Miserably Happy (2001)
 Dean Howard – Volume One (2004)
 Rock School [TV series soundtrack album] (2005)
 Leslie West – Guitarded (2005)
 Michael Lee Jackson – In a Heartbeat [SP] (2006)
 Nobuo Uematsu with Ian Gillan – Eternity (2006)
 Hoochie Coochie Men & Jon Lord – Danger. White Men Dancing (2007)
 Light My Fire: A Classic Rock Salute to the Doors (2014)
 Celebrating Jon Lord (2014, with Deep Purple)

Production
 Sammy – Sammy (1972) 
 Jerusalem – Jerusalem (1972) 
 Pussy – Feline Woman/Ska Child [SP] (1972) 
 Cliff Bennett – Nightride (1981) 
 Zero Nine – Blank Verse (1982) 
 Jill Towers – Welcome to Dreamfield (1999)

Selected film and TV appearances
 The Butterfly Ball (1977)
 Deep Purple – Heavy Metal Pioneers (1991)
 The Making of Bolland Project (1991)
 The Black Sabbath Story, Vol. 2 (1992)
 Tony Iommi: The Guitar That Drives Black Sabbath (1992)
 Rock Family Trees, ep. Deep Purple (1995)
 Pat Boone: In A Metal Mood (1996)
 Classic Albums, ep Deep Purple: Machine Head (2002)
 Roger Glover – Made in Wales (2004)
 Ian Gillan – Highway Star: A Journey in Rock  (2007)
 Seven Ages of Rock, ep. Never Say Die: Heavy Metal (2007)
 Heavy Metal Britannia (2010)
 The Seventies, ep. 1970 (2010)
 Chopin's Story (2011)
 Behind The Music Remastered, ep. Deep Purple (2013)
 Heaven on Their Minds: The Creation of Jesus Christ Superstar (2015)

References

Discography
Heavy metal discographies
Discographies of British artists